The 2000–01 season saw Dunfermline Athletic compete in the Scottish Premier League where they finished in 9th position with 42 points.

Final league table

Results
Dunfermline Athletic's score comes first

Legend

Scottish Premier League

Scottish Cup

Scottish League Cup

References

External links
 Dunfermline Athletic 2000–01 at Soccerbase.com (select relevant season from dropdown list)

Dunfermline Athletic F.C. seasons
Dunfermline Athletic